Kim Kyung-Soon (Korean: 김경순; born December 10, 1965), also spelled Kim Gyeong-sun, is a South Korean team handball player and Olympic champion. She received a silver medal with the South Korean team at the 1984 Summer Olympics in Los Angeles, and she received a gold medal at the 1988 Summer Olympics in Seoul.

References

External links

1965 births
Living people
South Korean female handball players
Olympic handball players of South Korea
Handball players at the 1984 Summer Olympics
Handball players at the 1988 Summer Olympics
Olympic gold medalists for South Korea
Olympic silver medalists for South Korea
Olympic medalists in handball
Medalists at the 1988 Summer Olympics
Medalists at the 1984 Summer Olympics
20th-century South Korean women